Ernst Willem van den Berg (3 December 1915, Amsterdam – 19 August 1989, Amsterdam) was a Dutch field hockey player who competed in the 1936 Summer Olympics.

He was a member of the Dutch field hockey team, which won the bronze medal. He played all five matches as forward.

External links
 
profile

1915 births
1989 deaths
Dutch male field hockey players
Olympic field hockey players of the Netherlands
Field hockey players at the 1936 Summer Olympics
Olympic bronze medalists for the Netherlands
Field hockey players from Amsterdam
Olympic medalists in field hockey
Medalists at the 1936 Summer Olympics
20th-century Dutch people